The , also referred to in English as the Japan Restoration Association, was a Japanese political party. It was launched on 12 September 2012 and gained official recognition on 28 September 2012. The party grew from the regional Osaka Restoration Association, headed by Tōru Hashimoto, Mayor of Osaka, and Ichirō Matsui, Governor of Osaka Prefecture.

On 17 November 2012 Hashimoto and Shintaro Ishihara, leader of the Sunrise Party, announced a merger of their parties to create a "third force" to contest the general election of December 2012. The merged organization, which retained the name "Japan Restoration Party", was at that time Japan's only national political party based outside Tokyo. After the election it had 54 seats in the lower house and 9 members in the upper house.

On May 28, 2014, co-leaders Hashimoto and Ishihara agreed to split the party after many internal differences, including disagreement over a proposed merger with the Unity Party. As a result, Ishihara's group split off from the JRP and formed the Party for Future Generations. Later, Hashimoto and Kenji Eda of the Unity Party agreed to merge their parties. The JRP was subsequently dissolved and the result of the merger was the formation of the Japan Innovation Party.

Party launch and early days
National political parties in Japan require a minimum of five Diet members to be recognized, and in 2012 the party gained seven sitting Diet members through defections from other parties. On 28 September 2012 an application for party recognition was submitted to the Ministry of the Interior through the Osaka prefectural electoral board. This was accepted and the party was officially launched. The Osaka Restoration Association, also headed by Hashimoto and Matsui, was placed under the umbrella of the new national party.

The first meeting of the nine JRA lawmakers was held on 3 October 2012. Yorihisa Matsuno, a member of the House of Representatives who had formerly been in the Democratic Party of Japan, was selected as the leader of the nine lawmakers, and rules of conduct were also adopted.

The party's first general meeting was held on 6 October 2012, with Matsuno formally becoming a deputy party leader, along with Yutaka Imai, a member of the Osaka Prefectural Assembly. Hashimoto said that in cases where national NRA members and regional assembly members could not agree he would make a decision.

Policies

The party maintained . These policies covered more than 200 items dealing with issues such as governance, economic policy, social welfare, education, diplomacy, and severing Japan's status as "America's mistress".

The party supported legalizing same-sex marriage.

The party advocated revising the Constitution of Japan, which it characterized as "the Occupation Constitution".

When the Japanese government proposed to revise the laws such that Japan's military would be able to mobilise overseas, the party was the only one to vote no, as all the other opposition parties had walked out.

Merger with the Sunrise Party
After much discussion, on 17 November 2012 Ishihara and Hashimoto decided to merge their parties, with Ishihara becoming the head of the Japan Restoration Party. Your Party would not join the party, nor would Tax Cuts Japan, as the latter party's opposition to any increase in the consumption tax did not match the JRP's policy in favour of an increase. Following Hashimoto's controversial remarks on the issue of "comfort woman during World War II, Yoshimi Watanabe announced that Your Party had decided to end their planned alliance for the upcoming Upper House elections.

Split with former Sunrise members
On May 28, 2014, co-leaders Hashimoto and Shintarō Ishihara agreed to split the party after many internal differences and a proposed merger with the Unity Party, especially their differences regarding the Constitution of Japan. The division is to be in accordance with the Political Parties Subsidies Act in order to split the subsidies each group receives.
The party launched with 19 representatives and 3 councilors on 1 August 2014, the day after the formalities of the "dissolution" of the Japan Restoration Party. Hashimoto's followers relaunched a new Japan Restoration Party, which has a similar organization to the old one. Hashimoto's Japan Restoration Party planned to unite with the Unity Party within 1–2 months. Upon the division of the party, two representatives chose to join neither group, and became independents.

Merger with Unity Party
On 22 September 2014, Hashimoto and Kenji Eda of the Unity Party agreed to merge their parties. The JRP was subsequently dissolved; the result of the merger is the Japan Innovation Party.

Presidents of JRP

Election results

House of Representatives

House of Councillors

See also
 Osaka Restoration Association

References

External links

2012 establishments in Japan
2014 disestablishments in Japan
Conservative parties in Japan
Defunct political parties in Japan
Far-right politics in Japan
Libertarian parties in Japan
Nationalist parties in Japan
Neoconservatism
Neoliberal parties
Political parties disestablished in 2014
Political parties established in 2012
Politics of Osaka Prefecture